Daraya is a Lebanese village located in Chouf District in Mount Lebanon Governorate. The name is derived from "Dar" which means house or home.

Location
Daraya belongs to the Chouf District; it is linked with the Lebanese coast by Al-Jiyya-Barja, Saydata-Dibbiyeh, and Wadi Zeina-Shheem roads. It is located 12 km away from Beit ed-Dine, 35 km from Baabda and 40 km away from Beirut. 
Daraya is 600–800 meters above the sea level.

Area and population 

Its area is about 481.5 hectares and most of the area consists of hills. Highlands are planted with olives, grapevines and figs, while plains are planted with vegetables. There are also some small woods.
The population is about 4132 persons. Nearly half of them have the right to vote.

References 

Populated places in Chouf District
Maronite Christian communities in Lebanon